Faiyaz Siddiq Koya is an Fijian politician of Indian descent and Member of the Parliament of Fiji. He served as Minister for Industry, Trade, Tourism, Lands & Mineral Resources from 2014 to 2018. In March 2020, Koya was awarded a Parliamentary seat. In April 2020, after Prime Minister Voreqe Bainimarama announced a cabinet reshuffle, Faiyaz Koya was appointed the portfolios of Minister for Commerce, Trade, Tourism and transport.

Koya is the son of former National Federation Party leader Sidiq Koya. He is a lawyer and a former board member of Tourism Fiji, the Fiji Legal Aid Commission and the Fiji Hotel Licensing Board.

In the 2014 election Koya received 895 votes, the 81st highest total amongst all candidates and the 31st highest number of votes among FijiFirst candidates. As his party performed well enough to be eligible for 32 seats, his 895 votes was sufficient to be elected into parliament  He served a twelve-day stint as Attorney-General of Fiji (24 September — 6 October 2014). In the 2018 elections Koya did not receive enough votes to enter parliament. In March 2020, Koya was awarded a parliamentary seat. In April 2020, Koya became Minister for Commerce, Trade, Tourism and Transport.

References

Indian members of the Parliament of Fiji
FijiFirst politicians
Trade ministers of Fiji
Transport ministers of Fiji
Tourism ministers of Fiji
Fijian Muslims
20th-century Fijian lawyers
Fijian businesspeople
Politicians from Ba (town)
Attorneys-general of Fiji
21st-century Fijian lawyers